The Boston cream doughnut (or Boston cream pie doughnut, also spelled donut) is a round, solid, yeast-risen doughnut with chocolate frosting and a custard filling, resulting in a doughnut reminiscent of a miniature Boston cream pie.

The doughnut was inspired by the Boston cream pie which was, in turn, created by chef M. Sanzian at Boston's Parker House Hotel in 1856. The cake consists of vanilla-flavored custard sandwiched between two-layers of sponge cake and topped with chocolate glaze and has been popular in Massachusetts since its creation. The doughnut adaptation of the pie is popular not only in Massachusetts but throughout the United States and Canada.

State doughnut of Massachusetts 

The Boston cream doughnut was designated the official doughnut of Massachusetts in 2003 (the Boston cream pie itself had already been chosen as the state dessert in 1996). Although the doughnut's popularity made it the natural choice for the state, it is one of only two official state donuts—the only other one being the beignet, the state donut of Louisiana .

See also

 List of regional dishes of the United States
 List of doughnut varieties
 List of breakfast foods

References

External links
 

Custard desserts
American desserts
Chocolate-covered foods
Stuffed desserts
Massachusetts cuisine
American doughnuts